The aquatics events at the 2005 Southeast Asian Games included swimming, diving and water polo disciplines. All events were held in Trace College Aquatics Centre, Los Baños, Laguna, Philippines

Swimming
The Swimming competition was held 29 November to 4 December, and featured 32 events.

Medal table

Medalists
Men

Women

Diving
The diving events at the 2005 Southeast Asian Games took place in the Trace College Aquatic Centre in Los Baños, Laguna. It was held from November 27 to 30. Eight gold medals were contested in four disciplines.

Medal table

Medalists
Men

Women

Water polo

The Water polo events were held from 21 November to 26 November 2005 at the Trace College, Los Baños, Laguna. Six teams were in competition in a round-robin format, with defending champion Singapore looking towards retaining its crown won 20 times consecutively since 1965. The team's win over Thailand on the fourth day of the tournament effectively meant it has worn the gold medal regardless of the score in its final match against Vietnam. The Philippines team managed to take the silver medal, equaling its best showing in the 1993 Southeast Asian Games.

Medalists

Round-robin
Standings

Results

Games Records
Men's 50 m Freestyle: Thailand's Arwut Chinnapasaen, 22.98
(previous record of 23.03 was set in ? by Richard Sambera)
Men's 4x200 m Freestyle Relay: Singapore's Chay Jung Jun Mark, Cheah Mingzhe Marcus, Tan Lee Yu Gary, Tay Zhi Rong Bryan, 7:35.85
(previous record of 7:38:82 was set in 2001 by Singapore's relay team)
Women's 50 m Freestyle: Singapore's Joscelin Yeo, 26.13
(previous record of 26.23 was set in ? by ?)
Women's 100 m Backstroke: Singapore's Tao Li, 1:03.83
(previous record of ? was set in ? by ?)
Women's 100 m Butterfly: Singapore's Joscelin Yeo, 59.91
(previous record of 1:00.44 was set in 1999 by Joscelin Yeo)
Women's 200 m Butterfly: Singapore's Tao Li, 2:14.11
(previous record of ? was set in 1999 by Joscelin Yeo)
Women's 4x100 m Medley Relay: Singapore's Ho Shu Yong, Tao Li, Nicolette Teo, Joscelin Yeo, 4:14.49
(previous record of 4:19.23 was set in 1997 by Indonesia's relay team)

External links
 Southeast Asian Games Official Results

2005 Southeast Asian Games events
2005 in water sports
2005
Swimming in the Philippines
Diving in the Philippines
International water polo competitions hosted by the Philippines